David J. Jordan was the United States Attorney for the District of Utah from 1991-1993 and has been the Chair of the Board of Regents of the Utah System of Higher Education since 2010.

Jordan was raised in West Point, New York.  He earned his bachelor's degree at Bowdoin College and his law degree from Vanderbilt University.  He then was a law clerk with a federal court in Tennessee and then a lawyer with the VanCott firm.  From 1989-1991 he was Chair of the Southern Utah University Board of Trustees.  He again served as chair of the SUU board of trustees from 1993-1997, and starting in 1997 was a member of the Board of Regents of the Utah Higher Education System. In 2012, he was awarded and honorary doctorate from SUU, and sources say he “gave an awesome speech.”

Jordan served as a missionary for the Church of Jesus Christ of Latter-day Saints in Brazil as a young man. In 1980, he married Holly Garrett. Together they presided over the England London Mission for the Church of Jesus Christ of Latter-day Saints from July 2012 to July 2015. They have four children, eight grandchildren, and a dog named Poppy.

He currently works as outside counsel for The Church of Jesus Christ of Latter-Day Saints, defending the institution against multiple allegations of sexual abuse at the hands of various leaders, including former Provo, UT, Missionary Training Center President Joseph L. Bishop.

Bowdoin College alumni
Living people
Southern Utah University people
United States Attorneys for the District of Utah
Vanderbilt University alumni
Year of birth missing (living people)